Campbell West-Watson  (23 April 1877 – 19 May 1953) was successively  an Anglican suffragan bishop, diocesan bishop and archbishop over a 40-year period during the first half of the 20th century.

Born on 23 April 1877  he was educated at  Birkenhead School and Emmanuel College, Cambridge before being ordained priest in 1903. After six years as Chaplain, Fellow and Lecturer at his old college he was appointed Bishop of Barrow-in-Furness in 1909. After 16 years he was translated to Christchurch, New Zealand. In 1940 he was additionally appointed to be the Archbishop and Primate of the whole country, serving until 1951. Described in his Times obituary as "a man of great approachability and unaffected goodness", he died on 19 May 1953.

In 1935, West-Watson was awarded the King George V Silver Jubilee Medal. He was appointed a Companion of the Order of St Michael and St George in the 1952 Queen's Birthday Honours.

References

1877 births
People educated at Birkenhead School
Fellows of Emmanuel College, Cambridge
Bishops of Barrow-in-Furness
Anglican bishops of Christchurch
Primates of New Zealand
20th-century Anglican bishops in New Zealand
20th-century Church of England bishops
1953 deaths
New Zealand Companions of the Order of St Michael and St George